Phineas Banning High School is located in the Wilmington neighborhood of Los Angeles, California, and is a part of the Los Angeles Unified School District.

History 
Banning High School was renamed in honor of General Phineas Banning when a newer facility at Avalon and Pacific Coast Highway was opened in 1926. The 'old' red brick building was a landmark in the Wilmington town for many years. The ivy covered brick building suffered damage in the 1971 Sylmar earthquake and was torn down in 1973. For three years, classes were held in bungalows while the new building was being constructed. In fall 1975, the new building was opened on the grounds with a Lakme Avenue address. Along with the new building, a new gymnasium and swimming pool were added to the campus—the home of the Banning Pilots.

It was in the Los Angeles City High School District until 1961, when it merged into LAUSD.

After several years of repeated failure to improve its unsatisfactory performance, Banning High School entered LAUSD's Public School Choice process in 2012, which allowed teacher teams to develop reform plans. As a result, the Banning High School campus is slated to be divided into two schools: Banning High School (since state law prevents failing schools from changing their names) and the Banning Academies of Creative and Innovative Sciences (BACIS), a teacher-designed school with a design based on current educational research. BACIS was scheduled to open as a Small Learning Community in Fall 2013 and to become a separate school on the shared campus in Fall 2014. Its website describes itself as "composed of three themed academies, the Academy of Manufacturing and Engineering, the Academy of Computer Science and Digital Arts, and the Business and Technology Magnet."

Demographics
As of the school year 2008-09, there were a total of 3,374 students attending the high school.

90% Hispanics (3009)
5% Black (191)
1.5% White (49)
0.1% Native American (5)
1.7% Asian (59)
1.8% Pacific Islander (59)

Facilities
A new building was built in 1975 to replace the 'old' red ivy covered brick building, which was damaged during the 1971 Sylmar earthquake and was a landmark in Wilmington for many years. A new gym and a swimming pool were added to the campus.

Notable alumni

Tonie Campbell Olympic Bronze medalist
Michael Chambers
Vince Ferragamo
 Jack Gifford
Jeff Griffin
Dan Guerrero
Courtney Hall
 Wilder W. Hartley (Los Angeles City Council member)
Jamelle Holieway
Leroy Holt
Steve Lewis
Frank Manumaleuna 
Fred Matua
Freeman McNeil
Danny Reece
Steve Rivera
Tyrone Rodgers
Ron Settles
Thuy Trang
Mark Tucker
Peter "Navy" Tuiasosopo
Bob Whitfield
Stanley Wilson
Brett Young — former CFL defensive back.
Mike Busby — former MLB pitcher for the St. Louis Cardinals.
Travis Davis — former NFL safety.
 Ernie Kell — mayor of Long Beach, California from 1984 to 1994

References

External links
 
 Banning-High-School-Marching-Band-Alumni

Los Angeles Unified School District schools
High schools in Los Angeles County, California
Public high schools in California
Wilmington, Los Angeles
1926 establishments in California
Educational institutions established in 1926